Koecher or Köcher may refer to:

 Dick Koecher (born 1926), American former professional baseball pitcher
 Karl Koecher (born 1934), Czechoslovak spy, the only mole known to have penetrated the CIA
 Max Koecher (1924–1990), German mathematician
 Steven Koecher (born 1979), American man missing since 2009